Xiasha (Chinese: t , s , p Xiàshā,  "Lower Sands") is an industrial and educational center, located about  east of central Hangzhou, the capital of Zhejiang Province in the People's Republic of China. It is administered as a subdistrict of Hangzhou's Qiantang District.

Geography 
This area is included is part of the Yangtze River Delta region, which includes Shanghai, Jiangsu, and Zhejiang Provinces.

History 
Xiasha is also called HEDA, which stands for the Hangzhou Economic and Technological Development Area. The area was founded in 1993 as one of China's first state level development zones. The zone currently occupied 34 square kilometers and may soon expand to a long range estimate of 100 kilometers. Xiasha strives to be an international industrial, scientific and manufacturing zone, paramount with a park of flags from all over the World which can be seen upon entering the center of Xiasha. Most of what is produced in Xiasha are microelectronics, mobile telecommunications, optical equipment products, automobile products, chemicals and computer laptops.

Several international companies are located in the Xiasha including German owned Siemens High Voltage circuit breaker company, Motorola Mobile Communications Ltd., Toshiba, Mitsubishi, Allergan pharmaceuticals, Turumo Medical Corporation, Panasonic Motors, Dingyi, and food giant Wahaha. HEDA boasts 600 industrial enterprises in all.

Education 

Xiasha is also a district of colleges and universities. Xiasha has 14 universities, including the well-known Zhejiang Sci-Tech University, Zhejiang Gongshang University and Hangzhou Dianzi University. These 14 Universities house and educate 200,000 students, and many of the small businesses in the zone cater to these students. Most all of these schools were formerly in the city of Hangzhou, but moved to Xiasha starting around 2000. Moving Universities and Senior schools to outer districts is a new and popular concept now in China, as high real estate prices spur better economic development in the inner city. There are events for students and "English Corners", however many Expat teachers, and a few Chinese students complain about the relative isolation, the lack of entertainments, and the common view of the dull, flat landscape of the area, but since Xiasha is growing there is much to do if you have an imagination. The park near Zhejiang Sci-Tech is remarkable, with exquisite landscaping, arched bridges, sculpture, curved granite pathways. The streets have polished granite curbs, the sidewalks too are of polished and rough stone, with many park benches, trees, bike lanes. Canals with fishing areas are all over the city. The Qiantang river is nearby and often provides an ocean breeze as well as the largest "Tidal Bore" in the world. The river levee is completely paved and a car or bicycle can be ridden for miles on top of it.

Transport 

Most people who work in Xiasha district commute by public bus service, school and company busses, car or bicycle. However more high rise apartments are being built to fill the need of the workers there, and the urban area will rapidly get larger once the apartments are finished and the subway in operation.

There is excellent highway transportation leading to Xiasha from nearby cities, serviced by the Shanghai-Hangzhou, Hangzhou-Ningbo, and Hangzhou-Beilun highways. The nearest airport to Xiasha is the Xiaoshan International Airport, about 25 minutes by car. There are local taxi services that are numerous and easily noticeable on the roadways. The flagfall in a taxi is 6 RMB (0.70 USD) versus 11 RMB (1.54 USD)in Hangzhou proper. However, a HEDA taxi is not allowed to take fares into the city of Hangzhou, whereas a Hangzhou taxi can come to Xiasha and return to Hangzhou with a paid fare. Several bus lines tie Xiasha District to the city center of Hangzhou. The B1 Bus goes from Xiasha to Huanglong Stadium in Hangzhou (usually the bus will stop running at 9:30 PM), and the K525 Bus goes to Hangzhou Railway Station. Currently the Hangzhou Metro subway has been in operation. The starting stop is Wenze Rd, which is near Zhejiang Science and Technology University. It takes about 45 min to Wulin Square, which is faster than B1 bus. However, the ticket price is higher than B1.

See also 
List of township-level divisions of Zhejiang

External links
 Jianggan District Education Department 
 Jianggan District Government Website 
 Official website of Hangzhou government 

Geography of Hangzhou
Township-level divisions of Zhejiang